Metalizer is the third full-length release by Swedish heavy metal band Sabaton, but was actually recorded as their professional debut album (second overall) in 2002. The band's first record company, Underground Symphony, withheld the recordings for several years before arranging to release the rights to the band's new label Black Lodge Records.

The band's first album, the demo compilation Fist for Fight, is included as a bonus disc with a previously unreleased track. Most of the tracks on the first disc are re-recordings from this release.

Metalizer reached 21st place in the Swedish album charts.

In 2010 the album was re-released on German label Nuclear Blast with four bonus tracks, under the name Metalizer Re-Armed.

Track listing

Note
Disk 2 is the compilation of the two first demos of Sabaton originally released in 2000 in 600 copies but re-released in a limited digipak edition by Underground Symphony in 2001.

Personnel 
Sabaton
 Joakim Brodén – vocals, keyboards
 Rickard Sundén – guitars
 Oskar Montelius – guitars
 Pär Sundström – bass
 Daniel Mullback – drums
 Richard Larsson - drums (disc 2)

Production Staff (Disk 1)
Henke - mastering
Mats Brännlund - recording, mixing
Tommy Tägtgren - recording, mixing
Mattias Norén - cover art

Production Staff (Disk 2)
Mats Brännlund - recording, mixing
Tommy Tägtgren - recording, mastering
Ken Kelly - cover art

References

2007 albums
Sabaton (band) albums